Armine is an irreversible acetylcholinesterase inhibitor. It is the ethylphosphonate analog of paraoxon.

See also
Paraoxon
Ro 3-0419
Ro 3-0422

References

Acetylcholinesterase inhibitors
Phosphonate esters
Nitrobenzenes
Phenol esters
Ethyl esters